Hristo Atanasov Kovachki is a Bulgarian entrepreneur born on 17 December 1962 in the town of Samokov (Bulgaria). He is married to the former pop folk singer Desislava, with whom he has two children – a daughter Alexandra and a son Hristo. He graduated in St. Petersburg as a doctor of technical sciences and is an owner of a number of companies, as he has business interests in the field of energy as well.

Education 

In 1980 Hristo Kovachki graduated from the Secondary School of Mathematics in his hometown Samokov. He was admitted to study higher education at ITMO University (former LIFMO – Leningrad Institute of Fine Mechanics and Optics) in the city of St. Petersburg, Russia. Interested in science, in 1991 he successfully completed a PhD study by defending dissertation thesis Use of lasers in microelectronics. In 1994 he was awarded the degree of Doctor of Technical Sciences by the aforementioned university. In 2013 he was awarded the degree of "professor" by the International Slavonic Academy in Moscow. He is fluent in Russian, English and French. Hristo Kovachki is the author of a number of inventions, which are applied in laser technology, electronics and the energy sector.

Early career 

After his graduation Hristo Kovachki works on projects related to laser technologies. In parallel, he also elaborates and patents various inventions in Bulgaria, Russia and the European Union.

Since 1992 he develops his own business.

Business 

In the late 1990s Hristo Kovachki started developing his business interests in the field of energy.

He participates in the governing bodies of several energy companies. His name is linked to privatization deals in the mining industry (Beli Breg Mine, Stanyantsi Mine, MOV-Pernik, Bobov Dol Coalmining, Balkan Mine, Black Sea Mine, Chukurovo Mine) and the energy sector  (TPP Dimitrovgrad, TPP Bobov Dol, Brikel – Galabovo, which is the only producer of briquettes within the Balkans).

It is believed that he is associated with a number of district heating companies in the country, both gas- and coal-based, in the towns of Burgas, Sliven, Pernik, Gabrovo, Vratsa, Pleven, Ruse, Veliko Tarnovo.

Book 

In 2013 Hristo Kovachki released his first book to date entitled Universal order – theory of cognition. The book concerns a multitude of issues, starting with universal order, passing through biblical order, as the focus dwells on the theory of cognition and its various manifestations. The statement section formulates and discusses in detail the seven fundamental principles of cognition theory:
 First principle: The process of cognition is creative, positive, free and infinite;
 Second principle: The process of cognition is based on a reasonable form of existence of matter – reasonable individuals. The process of cognition is more powerful when this reasonable form of matter exists in harmony;
 Third principle: The more actively an individual participates in the cognition process, the higher form he will attain, both within society and within the entire civilization;
 Fourth principle: The greater the number of individuals is, the more intensified the cognition process will be.
 Fifth principle: The cognition process is based on reasonable forms of matter, which are reproducible.
 Sixth principle: The cognition process is a self-regulating process.
 Seventh principle: The cognition process is an evolutionary process.

Two corollaries are also inferred from these seven principles: 
 The cognition process underlies the foundation of generating the social product. The more stimulated the cognition process is, the greater the social product will be.
 The social product produced by society should be distributed on a fair (prorated) basis among the members of this society in accordance with their participation in the cognition process.

Wealth status 

The Polish news weekly Wprost releases at the end of each year a list of "Top 100 Richest Central and Eastern Europeans". In 2008 three Bulgarians were included in the ranking – Vasil Bozhkov in the 61st, – Hristo Kovachki in the 98th and Valentin Zlatev in the 100th position. According to the publication the wealth of Hristo Kovachki is estimated at $700 million. The amount is calculated based on the value of assets managed by Kovachki at the time.

Hristo Kovachki occupies fourteenth place in the ranking of the most influential Bulgarians in 2013 by Forbes magazine. He is followed by the businessmen Sasho Donchev, Grisha Ganchev, Bogomil Manchev, Vasil Bozhkov and others.

References

1962 births
Living people
People from Samokov
Bulgarian businesspeople